Hylomantis aspera is a species of frog in the subfamily Phyllomedusinae. It is endemic to Brazil. Its natural habitats are subtropical or tropical moist lowland forests, swamps, and intermittent freshwater marshes.
It is threatened by habitat loss.

References

Hylomantis
Endemic fauna of Brazil
Amphibians of Brazil
Amphibians described in 1873
Taxa named by Wilhelm Peters
Taxonomy articles created by Polbot
Taxobox binomials not recognized by IUCN